Osvaldas Jonas Balakauskas (born December 19, 1937 in  Miliūnai) is a Lithuanian composer of classical music and diplomat.

Career 
Balakauskas graduated from Vilnius Pedagogical University in 1961. After his mandatory service in the Soviet Army between 1961 and 1964, he studied composition with Boris Lyatoshinsky and Myroslav Skoryk at the Kiev Conservatory until 1969. From 1992 to 1994 he was the ambassador of Lithuania to France, Spain and Portugal (resident in Paris). In 1996  he was awarded  with the Lithuanian National Award, the highest artistic and cultural distinction in Lithuania. He is currently head of the Composition Department of the Lithuanian Academy of Music and Theatre. His output consists of symphonies, concertos, chamber and instrumental music.

Music

Important works include Sonata of the Mountains inspired by the paintings of Mikalojus Konstantinas Čiurlionis (1975), Symphony No. 2 (1979), Opera Strumentale (1987) and Symphonies No. 4 (1998) and No. 5 (2001), the last two named works having been recently recorded by Naxos Records.

Selected works
Stage
Komunarų gatvė (Street of Communards), chamber opera (1977)
Zodiakas (Zodiac), film-ballet (1984)
Makbetas (Macbeth), ballet (1988)
La Lointaine, chamber opera (2002)

Orchestral
Symphony No. 1 (1973)
Symphony No. 2 (1979)
Symphony No. 3 "Ostrobothnian Symphony", for string orchestra (1989)
Symphony No. 4 (1998), recorded by Naxos (8.557605, 2005)
Symphony No. 5 (2001), recorded by Naxos (8.557605, 2005)
Opera Strumentale (1987)

Concertante
Concertino for piano and string orchestra (1966)
Ludus Modorum for cello and chamber orchestra (1972)
Kalnų sonata (Sonata of the Mountains) for piano and orchestra (1975)
Passio Strumentale for string quartet and orchestra (1980)
Concerto for oboe, harpsichord and string orchestra (1981)
Sinfonia Concertante for violin, piano and orchestra (1982)
Concerto RK for violin and chamber orchestra (1997)
Concerto Brio for violin and orchestra (1999)
Capriccio for piano and orchestra (2004)
Concerto for clarinet and string orchestra (2008)
Seasons for 2 pianos and string orchestra (2009)

Chamber music
Sonatas for violin and piano (1969; No. 2, 2005; Februar Sonata, 2012)
Kaip marių bangos prisilietimas (Like the touch of a sea wave) for violin and piano (1975)
Medis ir paukštė (The Tree and the Bird) for viola and piano (1976)
Do nata for cello or viola and tape (1982)
Lietus Krokuvai (Rain for Cracow) for violin and piano (1991)
Maggiore-Minore for violin and piano (1994)
La Valse for solo violin (1997), after the concerto for oboe, harpsichord and string orchestra
Corrente for flute, viola and piano (2005)
Duo concertante for viola and piano (2007)
Trio concertante for flute, viola and piano (2008)

Choral
Requiem in memoriam Stasys Lozoraitis (1995), recorded by Naxos (8.557604, 2004)

Footnotes

References
Osvaldas Balakauskas. Lithuanian Music Information and Publishing Centre.
List of works - Osvaldas Balakauskas. Lithuanian Music Information and Publishing Centre.

1937 births
Living people
20th-century classical composers
21st-century classical composers
Lithuanian classical composers
Recipients of the Lithuanian National Prize
Ambassadors of Lithuania to France
Ambassadors of Lithuania to Spain
Ambassadors of Lithuania to Portugal
Lithuanian University of Educational Sciences alumni
Academic staff of the Lithuanian Academy of Music and Theatre
Musicians from Vilnius
Male classical composers
Twelve-tone and serial composers
20th-century male musicians
21st-century male musicians
NoBusiness Records artists